Quadriops is a Neotropical genus of water scavenger beetle in the family Hydrophilidae represented by six described species.

Taxonomy 
The genus Quadriops was described for the first time by Michael Hansen in 1999.

It belongs in the subfamily Acidocerinae. After a revision of the genus, it now contains six described species from Brazil (Amazonas), Costa Rica, Ecuador, French Guiana, Guyana, Panama, Peru, Suriname, and Venezuela.

Description 
Small to tiny beetles (1.6–2.6 mm), orange brown to dark brown in coloration, with eyes fully divided in dorsal and ventral faces; short maxillary palps. The elytra are laterally explanate and the elytral punctation may present well defined elytral striae. A complete diagnosis was presented by Girón and Short.

Habitat 
Quadriops is the only genus of Neotropical acidocerines known only from terrestrial habitats, including rotten fruits, sap flows on freshly cut trees, and in the refuse piles of leafcutter ants.

Species 

 Quadriops acroreius Girón and Short, 2017 
 Quadriops clusia Girón and Short, 2017 
 Quadriops dentatus Hansen, 1999 
 Quadriops depressus Hansen, 1999 
 Quadriops reticulatus Hansen, 1999 
 Quadriops similaris Hansen, 1999

References 

Hydrophilidae
Insects of South America